Abdelhak Boutasgount  (born 11 February 1986) is a French footballer. He played three matches for FK Baník Most in the 2006–07 Gambrinus liga.

References

External links
 
 

1986 births
Living people
French footballers
INF Clairefontaine players
Czech First League players
FK Baník Most players
Association football midfielders
French expatriate sportspeople in the Czech Republic
Expatriate footballers in the Czech Republic
French expatriate footballers
People from Romilly-sur-Seine
Sportspeople from Aube
RC Strasbourg Alsace players
Footballers from Grand Est